Shanzay (also spelled Shanzae, "Shanzeh", "Shawnzay" Persian شانزے) is a feminine name, which has the meaning Woman of Dignity and Princess/Royal.

Shanzay is a female name of Old Persian origin, and its basic root is either from Shah- an -zay (lit daughter of king/royal princess) or Shaan-zeh (Of dignity/magnificent) .

References

Iranian feminine given names
Feminine given names